Bethel A.M.E. Church is a historic African Methodist Episcopal Church at 1528 Sumter Street in Columbia, South Carolina.

It was built in 1921 and added to the National Register in 1982.

References

African Methodist Episcopal churches in South Carolina
Churches in Columbia, South Carolina
Churches completed in 1921
20th-century Methodist church buildings in the United States
National Register of Historic Places in Columbia, South Carolina
Churches on the National Register of Historic Places in South Carolina